Kentish Town was a ward in the London Borough of Camden, in the United Kingdom, covering Kentish Town. The ward was established for the May 2002 election. The population of the ward at the 2011 Census was 13,417. The ward was abolished for the 2022 election. Its area was transferred to the newly created Kentish Town North and Kentish Town South wards.

References

Wards of the London Borough of Camden
2002 establishments in England
2022 disestablishments in England
Kentish Town